Michel Vitold (1915–1994) was a Russian-born French stage and film actor.

Selected filmography

 Orage (1938) - Georges (uncredited)
 Adrienne Lecouvreur (1938) - Le tueur
 The Curtain Rises (1938) - Gabriel, un élève du Conservatoire
 Accord final (1938) - Un élève du conservatoire de musique
 La Symphonie fantastique (1942) - Un chef d'orchestre (uncredited)
 Fantastic Night (1942) - Boris
 Mariage d'amour (1942) - Le fou du sixième
 Madame et le mort (1943) - Nazarian
 Malaria (1943) - Henri Malfas
 Ceux du rivage (1943) - Le juge d'instruction
 Le brigand gentilhomme (1943) - Le roi Don Carlos
 L'aventure est au coin de la rue (1944) - Waldo
 The Island of Love (1944) - André Bozzi
 François Villon (1945) - Noël, le borgne
 The Last Judgment (1945) - Vassili
 Le visiteur (1946) - Oxner
 Rouletabille joue et gagne (1947)
 Rouletabille contre la dame de pique (1948)
 The Secret of Mayerling (1949) - L'archiduc Jean-Salvator
 Messalina (1951) - Narciso / Narcissus
 Jouons le jeu (1952) - l'acteur (segment 'La paresse')
 Les révoltés de Lomanach (1954) - Rabuc
 The Doctor's Horrible Experiment (1959, TV Movie) - Docteur Séverin
 Maigret et l'Affaire Saint-Fiacre (1959) - L'abbé Jodet - curé de Saint-Fiacre
 L'ennemi dans l'ombre (1960) - Eric Urenbach
 Vacances en enfer (1961) - M. Martel
 Adorable Liar (1962) - Antoine
 Les Ennemis (1962) - Andreï Smoloff
 The Dance (1962) - Antonin
 Arsène Lupin contre Arsène Lupin (1962) - Kartenberg devenu le baron Von Krantz
 Ballade pour un voyou (1963) - Stéphane Donnacil
 Rififi in Tokyo (1963) - Pierre Merigné
 Judex (1963) - Le banquier Favraux
 Les Pas perdus (1964) - Pierre Simonnet
 Thomas the Impostor (1965) - Le docteur Vernes
 Le Chant du monde (1965) - Toussaint
 Le Franciscain de Bourges (1968) - François Magnol
 La Bande à Bonnot (1968) - Victor Kilbatchiche
 The Confession (1970) - Smola
 Love at the Top (1974) - Georges Groult
 France société anonyme (1974) - Le fourgueur
 Genre masculin (1977) - M. Jacquot
 That Night in Varennes (1982) - De Florange
 Basileus Quartet (1983) - Guglielmo
 Les matins chagrins (1990) - Georges
 Les chevaliers de la table ronde (1990) - Le Roi Pêcheur
 Listopad (1992)
 La joie de vivre (1993) - Henri Jolly (final film role)

References

Bibliography
 Raymond Durgnat. Franju: Movie Edition. University of California Press, 1968.

External links

1915 births
1994 deaths
French male film actors
French male stage actors
Actors from Kharkiv
Emigrants from the Russian Empire to France